Mike Minor (born July 28, 1990) is an American adaptive athlete, World Champion snowboarder, and a Paralympian who competed for the United States at the 2018 Winter Paralympics. He won gold in Snowboarding at the 2018 Winter Paralympics – Men's banked slalom and bronze in Men's snowboard cross division SB-UL. During his childhood, Minor was given a prosthetic part for his right arm. He starting skiing at the age of two and started snowboarding at the age of seven.  He was nominated for the Best Male Athlete with a Disability ESPY Award in 2017.

Career

Snowboarding 
Minor entered snowboarding competitions in 2015. In 2017, he won gold in snowboard cross and silver in banked slalom for World Para Snowboard Championships in Big White, Canada.  He also became a Triple Crystal Globe winner that year.  In 2018, he won a gold and bronze medal at the 2018 Winter Paralympics.

Skateboarding 
Minor won a bronze medal for skateboarding at the inaugural adaptive skatepark event at the Summer X Games 2019 in Minneapolis, Minnesota.

Awards and accolades 
Minor was nominated for 2 Team USA Male Athlete of the month awards and nominated for Best Male Athlete with a Disability ESPY Award in 2017.

Charity 
Minor works with Adaptive Action Sports, a non profit organization founded by Amy Purdy and Daniel Gale, which assists athletes with disabilities to train in adaptive extreme sports.

Personal life 
Minor was born in Scranton, Lackawanna County, Pennsylvania.

References

External links 
 
 
 Mike Minor at World Para Snowboard

1990 births
Living people
American male snowboarders
Paralympic snowboarders of the United States
Paralympic medalists in snowboarding
Paralympic gold medalists for the United States
Paralympic bronze medalists for the United States
Snowboarders at the 2018 Winter Paralympics
Snowboarders at the 2022 Winter Paralympics
Medalists at the 2018 Winter Paralympics
People from Lackawanna County, Pennsylvania
Sportspeople from Scranton, Pennsylvania